The Chunky River is a short tributary of the Chickasawhay River in east-central Mississippi.  Via the Chickasawhay, it is part of the watershed of the Pascagoula River, which flows into the Gulf of Mexico.

Course
The river is formed between the towns of Hickory and Chunky in southwestern Newton County by the confluence of Chunky Creek and Okahatta Creek. However, older maps continue to call it the Chunky Creek until a point in Lauderdale County.  The Chunky River flows generally southeastwardly through southwestern Lauderdale County and northwestern Clarke County, where it joins Okatibbee Creek to form the Chickasawhay River near the town of Enterprise.

Dunns Falls Water Park is a state park located along the river north of Enterprise.

The historic Stuckey’s Bridge spans the river in southern Lauderdale County.

Name
Chunky is a name derived from the Choctaw language most likely meaning martin (bird).

The United States Board on Geographic Names settled on "Chunky River" as the stream's name in 1963.  According to the Geographic Names Information System, it has also been known as:
Chanki River
Chunkey Creek
Chunkey River
Chunky Creek
Ectchangui River 
Tchanke River

See also
List of Mississippi rivers

References

External links
Dunns Falls Water Park website

Sources
DeLorme (1998).  Mississippi Atlas & Gazetteer.  Yarmouth, Maine: DeLorme.  .

Rivers of Mississippi
Bodies of water of Clarke County, Mississippi
Bodies of water of Lauderdale County, Mississippi
Bodies of water of Newton County, Mississippi
Mississippi placenames of Native American origin